Southern Symphony is the second album by American country music singer Russell Dickerson. It was released on December 4, 2020 via Thirty Tigers' Triple Tigers division.

Content
The album's lead single is "Love You Like I Used To". In addition to this song, a lyric video for "Never Get Old" was released on Vevo in advance of the album. Florida Georgia Line are a featured artist on "It’s About Time".

Critical reception
Rating it 3 out of 5 stars, Stephen Thomas Erlewine of AllMusic wrote that "Frivolity doesn't weigh heavily on Dickerson's mind, but Southern Symphony has a bright, shiny gloss that suggests it's a party. The production is so slick that the deeper emotions Dickerson attempts don't quite stick, yet the album is ingratiating due to his unassuming, friendly touch and its relentless smoothness."

Track listing

Personnel
Credits adapted from AllMusic.

Casey Brown - bouzouki, acoustic guitar, electric guitar, keyboards, programming, background vocals
Natalie Brown - background vocals
Dave Cohen - keyboards
Corey Crowder - electric guitar, keyboards, programming
Russell Dickerson - bouzouki, electric guitar, lead vocals
Mark Douthit - saxophone
Stuart Duncan - fiddle
Paul Franklin - steel guitar
Tyler Hubbard - vocals on "It’s About Time"
Dann Huff - dobro, acoustic guitar, electric guitar, mandolin, programming
David Huff - programming
Charlie Judge - keyboards, organ, synthesizer, Wurlitzer
Brian Kelley - vocals on "It’s About Time"
Tony Lucido - bass guitar
Chris McHugh - drums
Rob McNelley - electric guitar
Danny Rader - banjo, ganjo, bouzouki, acoustic guitar
Jordan Reynolds - electric guitar, keyboards, programming, background vocals
Jerry Roe - drums
Jimmie Lee Sloas - bass guitar
Aaron Sterling - drums
Russell Terrell - background vocals
Ilya Toshinsky - banjo, ganjo, bouzouki, acoustic guitar, resonator guitar, mandolin
Travis Toy - steel guitar
Mark Trussell - electric guitar

Chart performance

References

2020 albums
Thirty Tigers albums
Russell Dickerson albums
Albums produced by Dann Huff